Andreas Biermann (13 September 1980 – 18 July 2014) was a German professional footballer who played as a defender.

Career 
Biermann made his debut on the professional league level in the 2. Bundesliga for FC St. Pauli on 10 March 2008 when he started in a game against 1860 Munich.

Background 
On 19 November 2009, a few days after Robert Enke had committed suicide, he announced that he suffered from depression and had attempted suicide in October. He received inpatient treatment but committed suicide on 18 July 2014.

References

External links

1980 births
2014 deaths
Footballers from Berlin
German footballers
Association football defenders
2. Bundesliga players
Chemnitzer FC players
1. FC Union Berlin players
Hertha BSC II players
Tennis Borussia Berlin players
FC St. Pauli players
Suicides in Germany
2014 suicides